denotes the first female secretary of that particular department.

See also
Cabinet
Cabinet of the Philippines
Politics of the Philippines

External links
 List of female cabinet secretaries of the Philippines

Women

Philippines
Cabinet secretaries